Samuelene "Lena" Purcell (25 July 1898 – 20 December 1982) was a New Zealand shop assistant and trade unionist. She was born in Auckland, Auckland, New Zealand in 1898. She was active as a trade unionist from the 1920s to the 1960s and, alongside Alice Cossey of the tailoresses' union, was Auckland's most prominent female unionist during that time.

References

1898 births
1982 deaths
People from Auckland
New Zealand trade unionists